The 2022 World Series of Darts was a series of televised darts tournaments organised by the Professional Darts Corporation. Six World Series events and one finals event, which like the previous year took place in Amsterdam, Netherlands, were held.

After delays in 2020 and 2021, owing to the COVID-19 pandemic, three new venues made their debuts with New York City replacing Las Vegas for the US Darts Masters, and two Australian events were moved to new cities in Wollongong and Townsville. A fourth new venue was added on 11 April, with the Dutch Darts Masters making its debut at the Ziggo Dome in Amsterdam, scheduled for 24–25 June, meaning that Amsterdam hosted two events in the 2022 World Series.

For his run to the semi-finals of the Queensland Masters,  was awarded the trophy following the conclusion of the New Zealand Masters.

Prize money

World Series events

References

World Series of Darts